Fulbourn railway station (for some time misspelled "Fulbourne" by British Rail) is a disused railway station on the Ipswich to Ely Line, and located between  and . It served the Cambridgeshire village of Fulbourn, until its closure in January 1967. Although the station is now closed, the line remains in use—with passenger services provided by Abellio Greater Anglia.

Reopening of the station was proposed by Cambridgeshire County Council in May 2013 as part of an infrastructure plan to deal with projected population growth up to 2050.

References

Disused railway stations in Cambridgeshire
Former Great Eastern Railway stations
Railway stations in Great Britain opened in 1851
Railway stations in Great Britain closed in 1967
1851 establishments in England
1967 disestablishments in England
railway station